Sir Henry Watkin Dashwood, 3rd Baronet (30 August 1745 – 10 June 1828) was an English landowner and politician who sat in the House of Commons between 1775 and 1795.

Early life
Dashwood was the eldest surviving son of Sir James Dashwood, 2nd Baronet of Kirtlington Park, Oxfordshire and his wife Elizabeth Spencer, daughter of Edward Spencer of Rendlesham, Suffolk. He matriculated at Brasenose College, Oxford in 1763 and undertook a Grand Tour in 1768. He was extremely extravagant and in 1775 his father had to pay off his debts amounting to £25,000.

Political career
In 1774 Dashwood contested Wigtown Burghs on the interest of his brother-in-law John Stewart, 7th Earl of Galloway. With each candidate receiving only two of the four votes, Dashwood's opponent was initially declared the winner, but on petition the result was reversed and Dashwood was returned as Member of Parliament. He voted in support of Lord North in the 1770s. In 1779, Dashwood succeeded to the baronetcy on the death of his father on 10 November. He married Helen Mary Graham, daughter of John Graham of Kinross on 17 July 1780. Helen's uncles were MP's William and Robert Mayne and in 1780 he decided to stand at Canterbury which had been a Mayne seat.

Dashwood was unsuccessful at Canterbury and equally unsuccessful in obtaining a lucrative government office. In 1783 he was appointed Gentleman of the Privy Chamber an honorary appointment. After he came into his inheritance Dashwood sold most of the family estate to pay further debts.

Dashwood was a friend of the Duke of Marlborough and was returned unopposed on the Duke's interest at the pocket borough of Woodstock at the 1784 He was returned unopposed at each election until 1820.

Dashwood tried to persuade William Pitt the Younger to give him a peerage several times in 1794, as he was a loyal supporter of the government. Unhappily for Dashwood no preferment was forthcoming.

Later life and legacy

Dashwood died on 10 June 1828. He and his wife had four sons and two daughters, including: 
Anna Maria, married John Loftus, 2nd Marquess of Ely 
Sir George Dashwood, 4th Baronet (9 July 1829 – 7 December 1869), married Sarah Marianne Rowley. Their daughter, Susan Caroline Dashwood, married Charles George Cholmondeley, Viscount Malpas and became the mother of George Cholmondeley, 4th Marquess of Cholmondeley.
Georgiana Carolina, married Sir Jacob Astley, 6th Baronet

References

External links
	JJHC Family History page for Sir Henry Watkin Dashwood
 

1745 births
1828 deaths
Dashwood, Henry Watkin, 3rd Baronet
Members of the Parliament of Great Britain for English constituencies
Members of the Parliament of Great Britain for Scottish constituencies
British MPs 1774–1780
British MPs 1784–1790
British MPs 1790–1796
British MPs 1796–1800
Members of the Parliament of the United Kingdom for English constituencies
UK MPs 1801–1802
UK MPs 1802–1806
UK MPs 1806–1807
UK MPs 1807–1812
UK MPs 1812–1818
UK MPs 1818–1820
Gentlemen of the Privy Chamber